Saluki Stadium is a stadium on the campus of Southern Illinois University in Carbondale, Illinois. It is primarily utilized by the Southern Illinois Salukis football team.

History
Construction on Saluki Stadium was completed in August 2010.  The horseshoe-shaped stadium seats 15,000 spectators and hosts the school's American football program, replacing McAndrew Stadium.

McAndrew Stadium was built in 1938 and stood as the main track and football stadium for 73 years. It was replaced by Saluki Stadium in 2010. McAndrew Stadium's demolition began and was completed in February 2011.

Saluki Stadium is part of the $83 million Saluki Way Project, which includes a major renovation to the 46-year-old SIU Arena and a new athletic support facility (that features new football offices and football locker rooms). The first event held at the stadium was an open house on August 24, 2010. Southern Illinois christened its new stadium on September 2, 2010, with a game against Quincy.

Salukis Stadium itself is valued at $29.9 million. Along with the 15,000 seats, the stadium has a two-story press box with 12 club suites, a 2,500-square foot VIP Club Room, as well as  booths for radio, television, coaches and the print media. A Daktronics video board and new FieldTurf was also added in 2019. 

The stadium hosted a large watch party for the August 21, 2017 solar eclipse.

Features
Seating includes 1,080 seat-back chairs as well as capacity for nearly 2,500 on the grass berm enclosing the north end zone.  The two-story press box features 12 club suites, a  VIP Club Room, along with traditional booths for radio, television, coaches and the print media. A 20x40 foot scoreboard with video replay capabilities in the North end zone and expanded concessions and restrooms enhances the fan experience.

FieldTurf, a Tarkett Sports Company, installed its Duraspine PRO turf system and its patented sand and rubber infill at Saluki Stadium. The top-of-the-line artificial turf is the same that has been installed at Gillette Stadium, home of the New England Patriots, and numerous other high-profile collegiate institutions and pro football organizations.

Design
360 Architecture and Image Architects, Inc. designed Saluki Stadium and J. E. Dunn Construction Group/Holland Construction Services Joint Venture is the general contractor.

Attendance records

See also
 List of NCAA Division I FCS football stadiums

References

External links
Southern Illinois Salukis - Saluki Stadium
New football stadium SIUC's 'missing component'
SIU Board of Trustees approves planning, budget for Saluki athletics facilities

College football venues
American football venues in Illinois
Southern Illinois Salukis football
Multi-purpose stadiums in the United States
Buildings and structures in Jackson County, Illinois
Southern Illinois University Carbondale
2010 establishments in Illinois
Sports venues completed in 2010